The 1981 World Table Tennis Championships mixed doubles was the 36th edition of the mixed doubles championship.  

Xie Saike and Huang Junqun defeated Chen Xinhua and Tong Ling in the final by three sets to nil.

Results

See also
List of World Table Tennis Championships medalists

References

-